Haykin is a surname. Notable people with the surname include:

Michael Haykin (born 1953), writer
Randy Haykin, American venture capitalist
Simon Haykin, electrical engineer